Cosmopterix pararufella is a moth of the family Cosmopterigidae. It is known from Spain, Greece, Corsica, Crete, Cyprus and North Africa, including Egypt.

The wingspan is about 11 mm.

The larvae have been recorded feeding on Saccharum officinarum. They mine the leaves of their host plant. The larvae mine into the midrib to feed on tissue. They leave brown tunnels with longitudinal patches on the other side resulting yellow and dried leaves. The mine starts thin but gradually becomes wider. At the terminal end of the mine, the full-grown larvae pupates in a chamber with a covered circular opening.

References

pararufella
Moths of Africa
Moths of Europe